Darżewo may refer to the following places:
Darżewo, Pomeranian Voivodeship (north Poland)
Darżewo, Gryfice County in West Pomeranian Voivodeship (north-west Poland)
Darżewo, Koszalin County in West Pomeranian Voivodeship (north-west Poland)